Avoca is an unincorporated community in Jones County, Texas, United States.

It is on State Highway 6 at the intersection of Farm-to-Market Roads 600 and 1636, 8 mi southeast of Stamford. Avoca is part of the Abilene, Texas metropolitan statistical area.

History
Avoca was laid out at its current location in 1900, when the railroad was extended to that point; the town site had formerly been located a few miles away. The name is derived from the post office at the former site called Avo, before then the small town was called Spring Creek. In 2022 Avoca currently has 2 churches Avoca Baptist Church Pastor Mims and Avoca United Methodist Church formly Pastor was Dennis Huffaker and the Lueders Avoca High School. No post office or stores.

Education
The Lueders-Avoca Independent School District serves the area's high school students in grades 9 through 12. Pre-kindergarten through 8th grade attend the Lueders Campus.

Notable person
 Charles Stenholm lived in Avoca while a member of the United States House of Representatives.

References

External links
Avoca, Texas – Texas Escapes Online Magazine

Unincorporated communities in Jones County, Texas
Unincorporated communities in Texas
Abilene metropolitan area
1900 establishments in Texas